From July 8 to August 26, 2014, another conflict between Israel and Gaza escalated and led to the outbreak of a war between Israel and Gaza. Between 2,127- 2,168 Gazans were killed, including 578 children. The Gaza Health Ministry reported more than 70% of the victims were civilians whilst Israel reported that 55% of the dead were civilians. On the Israeli side 66 soldiers and 5 Israeli civilians, including one child, were killed. These violent outbreaks led to various speeches regarding the Gaza Conflict in front of the United Nations, given by the Prime Minister of Israel, Benjamin Netanyahu, the President of  the Palestinian National Authority, Mahmoud Abbas and members of the Human Right Watch and Representatives of the Secretary-General for Children and Armed Conflict.

Netanyahu`s speech in front of the United Nations General Assembly

On September 29, 2014, Prime Minister Benjamin Netanyahu gave a speech to the United Nations focusing on the Iranian threat and the most recent Israel-Gaza conflict. In the speech Netanyahu claimed that he had come to the United Nations "to expose the brazen lies spoken from this very podium"  against Israel and the soldiers of Israel.

This statement is referring to the 21st Special Session of the Human Rights Council on the Human Rights Situation in the Occupied Palestinian Territory, including East Jerusalem on July 23, 2014. During this Session the Human Rights Council accused Israel of  violating the laws of war and called for an investigation and report on violations by both sides, in order to identify the responsible ones.

Prime Minister Netanyahu stressed that by investigating Israel rather than Hamas for war crimes, the UN Human Rights Council had betrayed "its noble mission to protect the innocent". Furthermore, he accused the Human Rights Council of sending a clear message to all terrorists: "Use civilians as human shields. [...] Because sadly, it works." He stated that the UN's Human Rights Council has turned into a Terrorist Rights Council by accepting and giving legitimacy to the use of human shields.
Netanyahu reported in his speech that Israel had justly defended itself against terror tunnels and rocket attacks and had no intention in targeting innocent civilians. He mentioned that Israel " was doing everything to minimize Palestinian civilian casualties" by sending text messages, dropping flyers, making phone calls and announcing warnings on television. "No other country and no other army in history have gone to greater lengths to avoid casualties among the civilian population of their enemies."

The Prime Minister believes that not Israel but the Hamas has broken the International Law by hiding missile batteries in residential areas, using Palestinian as human shields and telling Palestinians to ignore the warnings of Israel to leave. Furthermore, he blamed the Hamas for deliberately placing rockets next to Palestinian children in order to create images of horror for the press. "Israel was using its missiles to protect its children. Hamas was using its children to protect its missiles."

Abbas`s speech in front of the United Nations General Assembly

Three days before Netanyahu's speech the President of the Palestinian National Authority Mahmoud Abbas gave a speech to the United Nations General Assembly as well. He stated that "Israel has chosen to make it a year of a new war of genocide perpetrated against the Palestinian people." He called for the support and recognition of the free and independent State of Palestine and for an end to the Israeli blockade and he blamed Israel for creating the "largest prison in the world for nearly two million Palestinian citizens". Abbas emphasized that Palestine, other than Israel, will maintain its commitment to international law, international humanitarian law and the international consensus. He criticized that Israel had been acting as a state above the law with "impunity and absolving it of any accountability or punishment for its policies, aggression and defiance of the international will and legitimacy", therefore creating a ground for the rise of extremism, hate and terrorism in Palestine. He stated that the people of Palestine are the ones who need immediate international protection and are in need of security and peace.

Human Rights Council on the Human Rights Situation in Gaza

Joe Stork, a member of the Human Rights Watch for Middle East and North Africa Division Deputy Director highlights at an event hosted by the Middle East Institute and the Foundation for Middle East Peace on the 5th September 2014,  that the law of war states, that the harm of civilians getting hurt or killed has to be minimized and that only evident military objectives are legitimate targets. However civilians can be considered as collateral damage, which means that they are damage aside from what was intended. Store argues that in the case of the Israel- Gaza Conflict in 2014, investigations and interviews with surviving victims have shown, that in many cases the death of civilians could have been prevented.

Moreover, Joe Stork referred to the attacks on six schools, three of them inhabited by displaced persons. The attacks were justified by claiming that the Hamas was using the school as a storage for their weapons. The victims described the school as empty from missiles and weapons. Stork also mentioned the shooting of a boy school in which 12 people were killed 8 of them children. The shooting was explained by the IDF by stateing that the attack was aiming to kill three Jihad terrorists who were passing by the school on their motorcycles. Why the motorcycle was shot in front of the school and not before or after passing it, was not answered by the IDF. An UN school, used as a shelter for over 3,300 displaced people was hit by Israeli shelling on July 30. The Israeli army had clear information from the UN that the school was housing displaced civilians. Many of them, including children, were injured and killed. Leila Zerrougui, Special Representative of the Secretary-General for Children and Armed Conflict condemn this as a grave violation of international law.

Joe Stork further stated that the IDF claims that a person which politically belongs to the Hamas is a legitimate target. However under the law of court a member of the Hamas party is not necessarily a terrorist and therefore not automatically an official legitimate target.

The Human Rights Council named on July 23 the following examples to prove the violations of international law and the international humanitarian law. Before the ground offensive began on July 17 the Human Rights Watch documented airstrikes which killed 30 civilians, 11 of them children. On July 11 airstrike hit the Fun Time Beach café near Khan Yunis, killing seven civilians. Two of them boys, as they were preparing to watch a World Cup game. The IDF claimed that they were"targeting a terrorist" but no further information was provided to explain why they attacked the terrorists in a public place where other civilians were at risk to be killed and injured. On July 16 two young boys were killed and three boys were wounded, trying to flee, by an Israeli missile struck on a Gaza City pier. The Israeli military stated that they attacked  because they had "identified Hamas structure" but targeted the boys (age 10 to 13) by accident,  as "fleeing fighters." A hospital was attacked by ground and air forces from July 11 to 17. The hospital staff was forced to leave and to evacuate the patients (none of them mobile), under fire. Stork said that the repeated use of guided missiles and direct tank fire on a hospital, is considered to be a war crime. Furthermore, he said the shootings of residential buildings aiming at family members of supposedly members of an armed group are unlawful. He continued saying that even a giving warnings before an attack does not make an unlawful attack lawful.
In the speeches it is also mentioned that  Palestinian armed groups violated the laws of war as well. Twice rockets in empty UNRWA schools were found and the rockets launched on Israel killed and wounded civilians including young children, and destroyed civilian property.
Therefore, the "Human Rights Watch urges the Human Rights Council to [...] investigate and report promptly and publicly on violations by all sides, identify those responsible for grave crimes, and issue recommendations to the parties and the UN, including on measures to ensure accountability."

Navi Pillay a high commissioner for human rights criticized at an emergency debate at the UNHRC in Geneva that Israel had not done enough to protect civilians. Furthermore, she accused Israel of committing war crimes. She highlights, that the killing of civilians in Gaza, included dozens of children and had led to concerns over Israel's foreign policy and its respect for proportionality. The 47- member Geneva state forum accepted the Palestinian resolution by a vote of one state against the investigations (United States) and 29 states in favour of the investigation. 17 states were abstentions (including Germany and other European Union members). The presented resolution called for "an independent, international commission of inquiry" to investigate "all violations of international human rights law and international humanitarian law in the occupied Palestinian territory, including East Jerusalem, particularly in the occupied Gaza Strip".

References

2014 Israel–Gaza conflict
History of the United Nations
Human Rights Watch
2014 in international relations